Syzygy  (from Greek Συζυγία "conjunction, yoked together") may refer to:

Science
 Syzygy (astronomy), a collinear configuration of three celestial bodies
 Syzygy (mathematics), linear relation between generators of a module
 Syzygy, in biology, the pairing of chromosomes during meiosis
 Syzygy endgame tablebases, used by chess engines

Philosophy
 Syzygy, a concept in the philosophy of Vladimir Solovyov denoting "close union"
 Syzygy, a term used by Carl Jung to mean a union of opposites, e.g. anima and animus
 Syzygy, female–male pairings of the emanations known as Aeon (Gnosticism)

Literature
 Epirrhematic syzygy: a system of symmetrically corresponding verse forms in Greek Old Comedy 
 "It Wasn't Syzygy", a short story by Theodore Sturgeon
 Syzygy, a novel by Michael G. Coney
 Syzygy (novel), a novel by Frederik Pohl
 Syzygy (poetry), the combination of two metrical feet into a single unit
 Syzygy Darklock, a fictional character in the comic book series Dreadstar

Film, television, and games
 Atari, Inc., the successor to the Syzygy Co.
 "Syzygy" (The X-Files), a 1996 episode of the science fiction series
 Syzygy, a Robot character from the video game Unreal Tournament 2003
 Syzygy, a game for the Dragon 32 home computer, published by Microdeal
 Syzygy, a linking word game by Lewis Carroll, published in The Lady magazine
 Syzygy, a Great Old One in the game Eldritch Horror (board game), introduced in the expansion Strange Remnants
 Syzygy Co., an arcade game engineering company co-founded by Nolan Bushnell
SYZYGY, the title of Chapter 4 of Part 2 of the Netflix series The OA

Music
 Syzygy, an alternative electronica music duo featuring Dominic Glynn
 Syzygy, composition by Del Tredici
 Syzygys (band), a Japanese band

Albums
 Syzygy (EP), 1998, by Lynch Mob

Songs
 "Syzygy", a track from the 1987 album Michael Brecker
 "Syzygy", a track by Gene Loves Jezebel on the 1990 album Kiss of Life
 "Syzygy, Part I", "Syzygy, Part II", and "Syzygy, Part III", tracks from the 2004 album Suns of the Tundra
 "Syzygy", a track by Los Angeles Guitar Quartet on the 2012 LAGQ: Latin album
 "Syzygy", a track by Mickey Factz on the 2015 mixtape "Y3"
 "Syzygy", a track by Laurel Halo on the 2017 album Dust

See also
 Caledonian Antisyzygy, a term referring to the Scottish psyche and literature
 Szyzyg, the YouTube username of Scott Manley